The 1976 Greenlandic Men's Handball Championship (also known as the  or ) was the third edition of the Greenlandic Men's Handball Championship. It was held in Nuuk. It was won by GSS who defeated B-67 in the final.

Venues 
The championship was played at the Godthåbhallen in Nuuk.

Modus 

The six teams were split in to two groups. And they played a round robin.

The third placed teams played a fifth place game, the second best the small final and the group winners the final.

Results

Group stage

Group I

Group II

Championship

5th Place Game

Small Final

Final

Final ranking

References 

1975
Handball - Men